The 1979 North Carolina Tar Heels football team represented the University of North Carolina at Chapel Hill in the 1979 NCAA Division I-A football season.

Schedule

Roster

1979 team players in the NFL
The following players were drafted into professional football following the season.

References

North Carolina
North Carolina Tar Heels football seasons
Gator Bowl champion seasons
North Carolina Tar Heels football